Canes Venatici Dwarf Galaxy may refer to one of two galaxies:
Canes Venatici I (dwarf galaxy)
Canes Venatici II (dwarf galaxy)